Sovann Pancha (UNGEGN: ,) is a 1970 Cambodian film directed by Yvon Hem starring Vann Vannak and Vichara Dany.

Plot
Penavong, Vann Vannak, a student of Ta Esei, is sent on a mission to capture the giant when he meets the beautiful Sovann Pancha, Vichara Dany. As soon as Penavong and Sovann Pancha meet, they contend in a battle. Penavong makes a promise with Sovann Pancha for if she loses in the battle she is to help him defeat the giant. After several days on the mission, the two interact with each other; and eventually, they fall in love.

Cast
Vann Vannak
Vichara Dany

Soundtrack

References

1970 films
Khmer-language films
Cambodian fantasy films